Ginger crunch, also known as ginger slice or ginger square, is a New Zealand biscuit confection consisting of a rectangular shortbread base topped with ginger icing.

There are many variations of this recipe. The shortbread base can contain additions such as rolled oats or coconut or is sometimes substituted with a biscuit base, with nuts or crystallised ginger often added to the icing.

References

See also
 Shortbread
 List of shortbread biscuits and cookies

New Zealand desserts
Biscuits
Shortbread